The Mubarak Mosque (English: The Blessed Mosque) is a mosque in Tilford, Surrey, England. It currently serves as the mosque on the site of the international headquarters of the Ahmadiyya Muslim Community, formally known as Islamabad. It was inaugurated on Friday 17 May 2019 by Mirza Masroor Ahmad, the fifth caliph of the Ahmadiyya Muslim Community.

Site history 
The place was established as Sheephatch Camp School, one of the 32 camp schools erected in 1939, designed by Thomas S Tait of Burnet, Tait & Lorne architects following the Camp Act 1939. During World War II, it was used as wartime evacuation centre for Ruckholt Road Central School in Leyton and later closed in 1943. The camp was leased to Surrey County Council from National Camps Corporation in 1946 and maintained it as a co-educational boarding school until its closure in 1977. The land was sold for £80,000 but was again put on auction in 1984 and bought by Ahmadiyya Muslim Association.

The Islamabad site was used for the Jalsa Salana, the annual convention of Ahmadiyya Muslim Community between 1985 and 2004. Since then the convention has moved to Hadeeqatul Mahdi near Alton.

In 2015, Waverley Council granted building permission for a new mosque and other facilities on the  site and a complete modernisation of the facilities was commissioned by Carter Jonas.

Headquarters 

The International Headquarters of the Ahmadiyya Muslim Community moved from Fazl Mosque, London to Islamabad on 15 April 2019, after serving for a period of 35 years since the fourth caliph of the community, Mirza Tahir Ahmad left Pakistan in 1984. 

The formal inauguration of the mosque was held on 29 June 2019 in the presence of faith, civic and religious leaders. Around 300 guests were in attendance, including MP Dominic Grieve, former attorney general, MP Sir Ed Davey, chair of Tilford Parish Council Debra Lee, and former mayor of Farnham David Attfield.

Facilities 
The mosque building consists of one dome and 32 fins including a glazed window in each fin. The mosque has two minarets standing just over 13m high with each minaret having a gilded finials. 

The facilities on the site include:
 Mubarak Mosque
 Residence of the Caliph.
 32 additional residences
 Administrative buildings
Muslim Television Ahmadiyya facilities
 Equestrian centre
 Sports hall
Courtyard

It is also the final resting place of Mirza Tahir Ahmad, the fourth caliph of the Ahmadiyya Movement.

See also 
The London Mosque (Fazl Mosque)
 Ahmadiyya in the United Kingdom
 Islam in the United Kingdom
 Islamic architecture
 List of Ahmadiyya buildings and structures

References 

Ahmadiyya mosques in the United Kingdom
Mosques in England
Mosques completed in 2019
21st-century mosques
Mosque buildings with domes